Eucomatocera vittata is a species of beetle in the family Cerambycidae, and the only species in the genus Eucomatocera. It was described by White in 1846.

References

Agapanthiini
Beetles described in 1846
Monotypic Cerambycidae genera